Biddiscombe is a surname. Notable people with the surname include:

Carl Biddiscombe (1924–2000), American set decorator
Craig Biddiscombe (born 1976), Australian rules footballer